Jordan-Hare Stadium (properly pronounced [in central Alabama dialect] as  ) is an American football stadium in Auburn, Alabama on the campus Auburn University. It primarily serves as the home venue of the Auburn Tigers football team. The stadium is named for Ralph "Shug" Jordan, who owns the most wins in school history, and Cliff Hare, a member of Auburn's first football team as well as Dean of the Auburn University School of Chemistry and President of the Southern Conference.
On November 19, 2005, the playing field at the stadium was named in honor of former Auburn coach and athletic director Pat Dye.  The venue is now known as Pat Dye Field at Jordan-Hare Stadium.  The stadium reached its current seating capacity of 87,451 with the 2004 expansion and is the 10th largest stadium in the NCAA. For years, it has been a fixture on lists of best gameday atmospheres and most intimidating places to play.

History

Early years
Before 1939, Auburn played its home games at Drake Field, a bare-bones facility seating only 700 people in temporary bleachers. With such a tiny capacity, Auburn was only able to play one game on campus per year, and frequently had to play many of its "home" games at neutral sites. By the 1930s, school officials realized that Auburn had long since outgrown Drake Field, and felt chagrin at having to play "home" games at Birmingham's Legion Field, Montgomery's Cramton Bowl, and even Memorial Stadium in Columbus, Georgia. More or less out of necessity, they decided to build a permanent stadium.

The stadium, then known as Auburn Stadium, hosted its first game on November 10, 1939, between the Auburn and Georgia Tech Yellow Jackets football freshmen teams. While the school was officially known as Alabama Polytechnic Institute until 1960, it had been popularly known as "Auburn" for years, and the decision to name the stadium as such reflected this. The stadium was dedicated on Thanksgiving Day (November 30) 1939 before the first varsity game played in the stadium, a 7–7 tie with the University of Florida under Auburn head coach Jack Meagher. The Gators had to dress at their hotel in Opelika because the stadium's adjoining field house was still under construction. The Auburn-Florida game was originally scheduled for December 2, 1939 in Montgomery. The game was rescheduled in order for the stadium to be dedicated on Thanksgiving Day, Auburn officials seemingly wanting the significance of the occasion to dovetail with America's established Thanksgiving Day football tradition, a plan nearly thwarted by Franklin D. Roosevelt's "Franksgiving" decree. Had Alabama not chosen to observe Thanksgiving on its original date, the stadium likely would not have been dedicated until 1940.

The stadium is frequently said to have opened with a capacity of 7,500; however, that was only the number of seats in the west grandstand (the lower half of the current facility's west stands). This is usually cited as the stadium's original capacity because the west grandstands were the only permanent portion of the original facility.  The actual original capacity of the stadium, taking into account the wooden east stand as well as bleachers behind each end zone, was approximately 15,000—a figure that was actually quoted by a number of official Auburn sources of the day.  The official attendance of 7,290 for the dedication game, as quoted by then-athletics business manager and future athletic director Jeff Beard, came from the number of tickets printed for the game. However, a thanks-for-coming note from Meagher cited the actual attendance as 11,095, and newspaper accounts reported that anywhere from 12,000 to 14,000 people were in attendance.

In the fall of 1947, Auburn students lobbied to rename the stadium Petrie Stadium in honor of Dr. George Petrie, Auburn's first football coach, who died in October that year. The first major expansion came in 1949, when the wooden bleachers on the east side were replaced with permanent seats and more seats were added to the west grandstand. This brought capacity to 21,500, and the stadium was renamed Cliff Hare Stadium.

Expansion

Shug Jordan became head coach of the Tigers in 1951. He was still coaching when his name was added to the stadium in 1973, making it the first stadium in the United States to be named for an active coach.  The stadium's capacity more than tripled via three expansions during his 25 years at Auburn; it seated 61,261 when he retired in 1975. Under Jordan's watch, the stadium became a horseshoe in 1960, and a bowl in 1970.

With the addition of the west upper deck in 1980 and the east upper deck in 1987, the stadium became the largest in the state of Alabama until the 2006 and 2010 expansion of Bryant–Denny Stadium (capacity 101,821) at Alabama.

For much of its history, Auburn played home games against their traditional rivals at neutral sites rather than Jordan-Hare Stadium. This was partly due to the larger capacity and better amenities available at other stadiums, as well as relative difficulty in traveling to Auburn for most of the 20th century and the lack of accommodations in town. For instance, at the time the stadium opened, there were only two gas stations in town with public restrooms. In its first decade after the stadium opened Auburn only played a total of 12 true home games. Until 1960, all games against Georgia continued to be played in Columbus. Until the 1970s, Auburn played all home games against Tennessee and Georgia Tech at Legion Field. Georgia Tech first came to the Plains in 1970, while Tennessee came to Auburn for the first time in 1974.

Modern era

As Auburn became more accessible and the stadium expanded in capacity, more games were moved to Jordan–Hare Stadium.  By the 1980s, Alabama was Auburn's last major rival to have yet to play a game at Jordan-Hare Stadium. The yearly Iron Bowl clash between Alabama and Auburn had been played at Legion Field since it was renewed on a permanent basis in 1948. Initially, it made sense to play the Iron Bowl at Legion Field, since neither what was then Auburn Stadium nor what was then Denny Stadium had nearly enough seats to accommodate the crowds attending the game. At its height, Legion Field seated over 20,000 more people than Jordan-Hare.

From the 1970s onward, however, Auburn fans increasingly felt chagrin at facing Alabama in Birmingham, particularly after the 1980s expansions allowed Jordan-Hare's capacity to eclipse that of Legion Field by over 2,000 seats. Legion Field had long been associated with Alabama football, even though Auburn played some home games there well into the 1970s. Indeed, until the 1980s, most of Alabama's "home" football history took place in Birmingham, which was only 45 minutes east of Alabama's campus in Tuscaloosa.

By the time Dye became head coach and athletic director at Auburn in 1981, calls to make the Iron Bowl a home-and-home series had grown to a fever pitch. Years later, Dye recalled that almost as soon as he sat down with Bryant for the first time as Auburn's head coach, Bryant mused, "Well, I guess you're going to want to take that game to Auburn." Dye confirmed that hunch, saying, "We're going to take it to Auburn." Bryant noted that Alabama and Auburn's contract with the city of Birmingham ran through 1988, prompting Dye to reply, "Well, we'll play '89 in Auburn." Dye would have been well within his rights to move Auburn's home games for the Iron Bowl to Jordan-Hare as early as 1983. However, he knew that Bryant's standing in the state was such that it would be folly to attempt making the Iron Bowl a home-and-home series as long as Bryant was still alive.

After years of negotiations, the two schools agreed to play the Iron Bowl in Auburn in odd-numbered years. Alabama first came to the Plains on December 2, 1989—a game that saw #11 Auburn upend undefeated and #2 Alabama 30–20. The 1991 game was played at Legion Field, but has been played at Auburn in every odd-numbered year from 1991 onward. Alabama continued to play its home games for the rivalry at Legion Field until 1998.

An expansion in 2004 extended the east upper deck by an additional section on each end, adding more luxury suites and additional general seating to reach the current capacity of 87,451.

In 1998, artist Michael Taylor was commissioned to paint ten large murals on the east-side exterior of the stadium. The paintings depicted the greatest players, teams, and moments from Auburn's football history to that date. In 2006, Auburn updated these murals, including images that recognized great moments in Auburn football history up to 2006. In 2011, Auburn once again updated the murals, recognizing the greatest coaches, players, and teams up until 2011.

Auburn was the first Southeastern Conference school to install an HD video display and the second in the NCAA (after Texas' Godzillatron). In August 2015, a new LED videoboard that is 57 by 190 ft,  was unveiled and is currently the largest videoboard in college athletics.

In 2015, Auburn considered a complete reconstruction of the north end-zone section of Jordan-Hare which would have included new premium club seating and lounges, as well as establishing a new home locker room to replace the existing facility in the south end zone. The cost of this project was estimated at $145 million. After surveying donors and the general fanbase, the university did not move forward with those plans and decided instead to build a $28 million gameday support facility in the southwest corner of the stadium. The project includes renovation and expansion of the existing home locker room, relocation of the press box, a new player recruiting lounge, and a new premium fan club providing overviews of the end of Tiger Walk. The existing  press box in the west upper deck is being converted to an additional premium club seating and lounge area. The coaches boxes and television box will in this area will remain and be renovated. The total cost for this project is $12 million and will be completed by the 2018 season.

Capacity history

Other uses
Although Jordan-Hare Stadium is known primarily as a venue for football, it has hosted a handful of other events including an appearance by Billy Graham and concert appearances by James Brown, The Beach Boys, Miranda Lambert, Kenny Chesney, and Blake Shelton.

See also
 List of NCAA Division I FBS football stadiums

References

External links

 
 Van Plexico's complete history of Jordan–Hare

1939 establishments in Alabama
American football venues in Alabama
Auburn High School (Alabama)
Auburn Tigers football venues
Buildings and structures in Lee County, Alabama
College football venues
High school football venues in the United States
Sports venues completed in 1939